People's Hall may refer to:

Great Hall of the People, in Beijing, China
Sedbergh People's Hall, village hall in Sedbergh, Cumbria, England
Jinnah's People's Memorial Hall, in Mumbai, India
People's Hall, Tripoli, in Libya

Architectural disambiguation pages